Pincott is a surname. Notable people with the surname include:

Arthur Pincott (1877–1935), Australian rules footballer
Billy Pincott (1875–1955), Australian rules footballer
Sharon Pincott (born 1962), Australian author and specialist in the field of African elephant behavior
 (born 1928), Australian badminton player